Xıdırlı (also, Chidirly, Khidirly, Khidyrly, Khydyrly, and Kochev’ye) is a village and municipality in the Salyan Rayon of Azerbaijan.  It has a population of 2,977.

References 

Populated places in Salyan District (Azerbaijan)